Michael Meredith Hare (January 17, 1909 – August 30, 1968) was an American architect. Based in New York City, he advocated for modernism in architecture.

Early life and education

Michael Meredith Hare was born to Montgomery Hare and Constance Parsons Hare in New York City. He attended Groton School from 1921 to 1927. He entered Yale College in 1927 and transferred to the department of architecture in 1929. Following a leave of absence to study architecture in France in 1931, Hare returned to Yale in 1933 to complete his degree.

In 1931 he married Jane P. Jopling; they had three children. During the Second World War Hare served in the U.S. Marine Corps.

He later received a degree from Columbia University in 1935.

Career

Hare was seen as an imaginative, progressive young architect  who produced controversial designs.

While a student at Yale, his experiences in Paris changed him.  He was completely out of sympathy with the philosophy then prevalent at that school. In Paris, Hare had become converted to the Contemporary viewpoint, quite different from that held at Yale.

Hare later worked at New York architectural firm of Corbett and MacMurray, under famed architect Harvey Wiley Corbett. While at the firm, he was a part of a team of architects that helped construct Rockefeller Center and Radio City Music Hall.

In 1936, Hare designed the Nordic Theater, a single-screen streamline moderne cinema in Marquette, Michigan.  Initially the Peter White Building, the White family commissioned Hare to build the theater using an rare, unconventional design for acoustics.  The Nordic Theater later served as the world premiere venue for the 1959 film Anatomy of a Murder.

In 1937, Hare designed the Wisconsin Union Theater at the University of Wisconsin.

He was a member of the Board of Design for the 1939 New York World's Fair where he pushed for the Fair to be contemporary rather than colonial. His theme, "The Fair of the Future", was modified to "The World of Tomorrow."

In 1954, Hare was appointed by the President's Commission to design the U.S. embassy in Honduras.  While in Honduras, he began the study of philosophy, psychology, and psychical phenomena and wrote several books on these subjects in 1966 and 1968.

He died on August 30, 1968 in Cambridge, England.

Known Works

Rockefeller Center (1928)

Radio City Music Hall (1931)

Nordic Theater (1936)

Wisconsin Union Theater (1939)

Dau-Kreinheder Hall (Valparaiso University) (1955)

References

External links 

Wisconsin Union Theater

1909 births
1968 deaths
20th-century American architects
Architects from New York City